Huaping County is a county of Lijiang City, in the north of Yunnan province, China, bordering Sichuan province to the east. Huaping County has four towns and four ethnic townships under its jurisdiction, its administrative centre is at the town of Zhongxin.

History 
The earliest evidence of human settlement in Huaping County dates back to the Neolithic Age and is related to the Huilongwan archaeological relics.

The first dynasty to rule Huaping County was the Han dynasty (202 BC–220 AD), beginning in 130 BC, after Emperor Wu sent Sima Xiangru to appease the tribes in southwest China.

In the Song dynasty (960–1279), the region including the current Yunnan province became under the rule of Dali Kingdom.

In the late Qing dynasty (1644–1911), after the bureaucratization of native officers, it was under the jurisdiction of Yongbei Zhili Department. In 1909, Huaping County was officially established. Since then, Huaping has officially become an administrative organ at the county level.

Huaping County was controlled by the People's Liberation Army in 1950. It was under jurisdiction of Lijiang in 1980.

Administrative division 
According to the result on adjustment of township-level administrative divisions of Huaping county in 2015, Huaping County has four towns and four ethnic townships under its jurisdiction.

Geography 
Huaping County lies at the northwestern of Yunnan, bordering Lijiang to the west, Chuxiong Yi Autonomous Prefecture to the south, Ninglang Yi Autonomous County to the north, and Panzhihua to the east.

Rivers 
The Xinzhuang River and Wumu River, tributaries of the Jinsha River, winds through Huaping County.

Climate 

Economy 
In 2020, the regional GDP of Huaping County reached 7.42 billion yuan, an increase of 16.5%, ranking the first in Yunnan. Among them, the added value of the primary industry was 1.01 billion yuan, an increase of 4%; the added value of the secondary industry was 3.62 billion yuan, an increase of 18.5%, the seventh fastest growth rate in Yunnan; the added value of the tertiary industry was 2.79 billion yuan, an increase of 18%, the fastest growth rate in Yunnan.

Huaping County's economy is based on agriculture, animal husbandry, tourism, and mineral resources. The main crops are rice, wheat, corn, potato and vegetable. Mango, walnut, pomegranate, citrus, Zanthoxylum, bamboo, peach, and pear are the economic plants of the county.

Mineral resources 
Huaping County has an abundance of coal, iron, copper, granite, gypsum, kaolinite, bauxite, baryte, and feldspar.

Demographics

Population 

As of 2020, the National Bureau of Statistics of the People's Republic of China estimates the county's population now to be 159,695. There are 26 nationalities live in the county, including Han, Lisu, Yi, Dai, Hui and Miao.

Language 
Mandarin is the official language. The local people speak both Southwestern Mandarin and native language.

Religion 
Most people in Huaping County believe in Theravada Buddhism, and a few believe in Taoism, Islam, Catholicism and Protestantism. Catholicism spread into the country as early as the Republic of China. French missionaries built four churches in the county.

Education 
As of 2015, Huaping County has three high schools (including one private school), one vocational high school, one teacher training school, three middle schools, 62 primary schools and 36 kindergartens (including 34 private schools).

Tourism 
Huaping County is famous for its beautiful natural scenery, including Dragon Palace Cave, Fairy Cave, Carp River Water Conservancy Scenic Spot, and Fruit Mountain Scenic Spot. Two public parks are located in the county: Zhongxin Martyrs Memorial Park and Yongxing Martyrs Memorial Park.

Transportation 
The G4216 Expressway, also known as "Rong–Li Expressway", connects the county to Yongsheng County to the west, and Panzhihua to the east.

The China National Highway 353 is a major east-southwest highway that runs through the central county and intersects with the G4216 Expressway in the town of Rongjiang.

References

Bibliography

External links 
Lijiang City Official Site
Huaping County Agricultural Portal

County-level divisions of Lijiang